The Big Ten Conference Men's Soccer Freshman of the Year is an annual award given to the top freshman college soccer player in the Big Ten Conference.

Key

Winners

References 

Awards established in 1991
Freshman of the Year
College soccer trophies and awards in the United States
College sports freshman awards
Big Ten